The Bloody Beetroots is an Italian electronic music project of musician and producer Bob Rifo (also Sir Bob Cornelius Rifo and SBCR, born Simone Cogo). Established in late 2006, the Bloody Beetroots were initially a duo consisting of Bob Rifo and Tommy Tea, who later left in 2012.

Career
The leader of the band, Sir Bob Cornelius Rifo, was born in 1977 in Bassano del Grappa, Italy. He lives in Venice Beach, California. He is a classically trained musician, but gained reputation for producing music with styles ranging from punk rock to the new wave of the 1980s. His identity remains largely anonymous. In fact, the only identifying public feature he has is the year "1977" tattooed across his chest, which is the year of his birth, that coincided with the year punk-rock was born. Rifo, a music producer, DJ and photographer uses the pseudonym the Bloody Beetroots himself.

2006–2009: Early production and Romborama

Sir Bob Cornelius Rifo gained the support of Etienne De Crecy, Alex Gopher, and Dim Mak's Steve Aoki with his early singles "Warp 1.9" and "Cornelius", In 2008, his EP Cornelius was in the Top 100 International iTunes downloads.

In 2009, the Bloody Beetroots released his first album, Romborama. The Bloody Beetroots DJ Set (Sir Rifo and ex-member Tommy Tea) had a short tour of the United States in early 2008, alongside DJ Steve Aoki.

In 2009, Sir Rifo also worked on Rifoki, a hardcore punk collaboration with Steve Aoki.

2010–2011: Death Crew 77
Bloody Beetroots DJ Set played festivals including Stereosonic Festival in Australia, Ultra Music Festival in Miami and Rock Werchter in Belgium. During his 2010 Live Tour, Sir Rifo labeled himself and the live band the Bloody Beetroots Death Crew 77 and introduced drummer Edward Grinch. Tommy Tea was in charge of effects and sampling in the live band. In 2011, Grinch left the band and replacement drummer Battle took his place. Later in 2011, during the Church of Noise tour, vocalist Dennis Lyxzén of the punk band Refused joined and provided vocals for a few songs. With the new live show they continued playing various festivals across the world, including the Solidays Festival in Paris, MELT! Festival in Berlin, Extrema Festival in Eindhoven, Tomorrowland in Belgium, HARD Fest in Los Angeles, Electric Zoo in New York City, and headlined the 2011 New Year's Eve show at the Together as One festival in Los Angeles.

2012–2014: Hide
In 2013, the Bloody Beetroots released the album Hide.

The first single, "Rocksteady", was released in early 2012 along with two remix EPs. The second single, "Chronicles of a Fallen Love" (featuring Greta Svabo Bech) was released in December 2012, also with the two-part remix EPs. In February 2013, Bob Rifo announced a third single "Spank" (produced with TAI and Bart B More), as well as an accompanying music video. Sir Bob Cornelius Rifo also collaborated with Paul McCartney on the single "Out of Sight" on Ultra Records. It was released in June 2013.

For the entirety of 2012, Rifo and Tommy Tea toured the world as Bloody Beetroots DJ Set, including performances on festivals such as Tomorrowland, Ultra Music Festival and HARD Fest New York.

At the beginning of 2013, Sir Bob Cornelius Rifo re-introduced the live crew under the new name the Bloody Beetroots Live, which debuted in Australia in January. The mask Rifo wears on stage has been re-designed as well – now featuring wearable LED lights on the Venom-shaped eyes, which are controlled remotely via MIDI. The rest of the band also wears new masks, though they do not light up like Rifo's.

The live band consisted of Sir Bob Cornelius Rifo (piano/effects, guitars, vocals), Battle (synthesizers, bass guitar) and Edward Grinch (drums). However, in Australia, Grinch was replaced by member New Mad Harris on drums.
Since the beginning of 2013, Tommy Tea has dedicated himself to other personal projects.

In 2013, Rifo announced and released a new social media platform called "the Real Church of Noise", which is a "safe haven for like-minded individuals to share and collaborate". The platform incorporates sharing services such as YouTube and SoundCloud.

2015–present: SBCR and The Great Electronic Swindle
Shortly after the Chaos and Confusion tour, Rifo began to DJ across the world under the pseudonym SBCR (an acronym of his stage name). He released one EP titled SBCR & Friends, Vol. 1 on Dim Mak Records and began a tour around the world performing DJ sets.

In 2017, Rifo released two new songs under the Bloody Beetroots name: a collaboration with Australian band Jet titled "My Name Is Thunder", and a solo song titled "Satan Bass City Rockers". Rifo later announced the songs would be included on his third album, The Great Electronic Swindle, to be released on 20 October 2017.

The Bloody Beetroots also have a series of released/unreleased demos available for listening.

Members

Discography

Studio albums

Compilations

EPs

Singles

As lead artist

As featured artist
 "Run"  (2019)
 "Grand Slam"  (2019)

Music videos

References

External links
 
 Instagram

Italian electronic music groups
Masked musicians
Ultra Records artists
Monstercat artists
Musical groups from Veneto